East European Politics is a peer-reviewed academic journal covering the government, politics and societies of the post-communist space, including East Central Europe, the Baltic republics, South Eastern Europe, Russia, and all the countries of the former Soviet Union. It is published quarterly (4 issues per year) by Routledge (Taylor & Francis Group). The Editorial team consists of Senior Editors Adam Fagan (King's College London) and Petr Kopecky (Leiden University), Editors Lenka Bustikova (Arizona State University), Andrea L. P. Pirro (Scuola Normale Superiore) and Maria Spirova (Leiden University), as well as Editorial Assistant David Gazsi (King's College London).

Journal information 
East European Politics publishes original scholarship on political developments in individual countries, together with cross-country comparative analyses and studies relating the post-communist region to other parts of the world.

In addition to research articles and book reviews, East European Politics also publishes thematic special issues. The journal also publishes regular ‘symposium’ sections and review articles devoted to briefer analysis of particular events, political issues and important theoretical and conceptual developments. All research articles published in East European Politics have undergone rigorous peer review, based on initial editor screening and anonymized refereeing by at least two anonymous referees.

Publication history 
The Journal of Communist Studies was founded in 1984 by a group of scholars (Michael Waller, Richard Gillespie, Ron Hill, David Goodman, David Bell, and Michael Williams) with a shared intellectual interest in communist political systems, successors to an editorial team that had produced Documents in communist affairs (published in the early 1980s by Butterworths) and other publications dealing with the communist movement. While the journal set out to reflect the growing complexity of the communist world and movements, in the 1980s, its focus was on the ‘core’ countries and parties that had historically been part of the world of the Communist International. The primary emphasis was on politics, but history, sociology, non-technical economics, biography, and comparative studies also featured.

In 1992, and Transition Politics was added to the title to reflect changing realities. Following the change of title, the scope both widened, to embrace regime change and democratisation, and in practice also narrowed, to concentrate somewhat more on political analysis. The volumes published under the revised title included analyses of the politics and political science of the new democracies, several of which are now considered to be seminal works.

Since 2012, the journal is published under the title East European Politics.

Abstracting and indexing 
Articles appearing in the journal are abstracted and indexed in Scopus, EBSCOhost including International Political Science Abstracts Database, Political Science Complete, International Security & Counter Terrorism Reference Center and Public Affairs Index; Periodicals Index Online, CSA Worldwide Political Science Abstracts, Environmental Sciences and Pollution Management, International Bibliography of the Social Sciences and Sociological Abstracts (Online), among others.

See also 

 List of political science journals
 List of international relations journals

References

External links 
 
 Official Twitter page
Adam Fagan’s profile on the website of King's College London
 Petr Kopecky’s profile on the website of Leiden University
Lenka Bustikova's profile on the website of Arizona State University

Routledge academic journals
Political science
European studies journals
European studies
International relations by region
Area studies journals
Political science journals
International relations journals
Quarterly journals
English-language journals
Works about Eastern Europe